Ethmia anthracopis is a moth in the family Depressariidae. It is found in Australia, where it has been recorded from South Australia.

The forewings are shining white, with blackish-fuscous markings. The costal edge is blackish-fuscous, interrupted near the apex and there is a small costal spot at the base, as well as a larger one near the base, partly connected. There is also a small dorsal spot at one-sixth and a transverse bar from the costa at one-fifth, thickened upwards, reaching three-fourths across wing, interrupted on the fold. There is a triangular spot on the costa at two-fifths, its apex touching a discal dot. A small subdorsal spot is found before the middle and there is a small costal spot beyond the middle, as well as a subcrescentic spot towards the dorsum beyond the middle and an elongate spot along the costa at three-fourths, containing two white dots. The terminal streak is narrow. The hindwings are white, thinly scaled and the costa and apical fifth are fuscous.

References

Moths described in 1902
anthracopis